Viktor Ullmann (1 January 1898, in Teschen – 18 October 1944, in KZ Auschwitz-Birkenau) was a Silesia-born Austrian composer, conductor and pianist.

Biography 
Viktor Ullmann was born on 1 January 1898 in Těšín (Teschen), which belonged then to Silesia in the Austro-Hungarian Empire and is now divided between Cieszyn in Poland and Český Těšín in the Czech Republic. Both his parents were from families of Jewish descent, but had converted to Roman Catholicism before Viktor's birth. As an assimilated Jew, his father, Maximilian, was able to pursue a career as a professional officer in the army of the Austro-Hungarian Empire. In World War I he was promoted to colonel and ennobled.

One writer has described Ullmann's milieu in these terms: "Like such other assimilated German-speaking Czech Jews as Kafka and Mahler, Ullmann lived a life of multiple estrangements, cut off from Czech nationalism, German anti-Semitism and Jewish orthodoxy".

Beginning in 1909 Viktor attended a grammar school (Gymnasium) in Vienna. His musical talents and inclinations soon gave him access to Arnold Schönberg and his circle of pupils. Upon finishing school, he volunteered for military service.

After deployment on the Italian Front at Isonzo , he was granted study leave, which he used to start studying law at Vienna University. There he also attended the lectures of Wilhelm Jerusalem. At the beginning of 1918 he was accepted in Schöenberg's composition seminar. With Schöenberg he studied the theory of form, counterpoint and orchestration. Ullmann was an excellent pianist, although he had no ambitions for a career as a soloist.

In May 1919, he broke off both courses of study and left Vienna in order to devote himself fully to music in Prague. His mentor was now Alexander von Zemlinsky, under whose direction he served as a conductor at the New German Theatre of Prague (now the Prague State Opera) until 1927. In the following season, 1927–28, he was appointed head of the opera company in Aussig an der Elbe (Ústí nad Labem), but his repertoire, including operas by Richard Strauss, Krenek and others, was too advanced for local tastes, and his appointment was terminated.

In 1923 with the Sieben Lieder mit Klavier (7 Songs with Piano) he witnessed a series of successful performances of his works, which lasted until the beginning of the 1930s (Sieben Serenaden). At the Geneva music festival of the International Society for New Music in 1929, his Schönberg Variations, a piano cycle on a theme by his teacher in Vienna, caused something of a stir. Five years later, for the orchestral arrangement of this work, he was awarded the Hertzka Prize, named in honor of the former director of Universal Edition. In the meantime he had been appointed conductor in Zürich for two years. As a result of his interest in anthroposophy, a movement founded by Rudolf Steiner, he spent another two years as a bookseller in Stuttgart, but was forced to flee Germany in mid-1933 and returned to Prague as a music teacher and journalist.

During this period he worked with the department of music at Czechoslovak Radio, wrote book and music reviews for various magazines, wrote as a critic for the Bohemia newspaper, lectured to educational groups, gave private lessons, and was actively involved in the program of the Czechoslovak Society for Music Education. At about this time Ullmann made friends with the composer Alois Hába, whom he had known for some time. Ullmann enrolled in Hába's department of quarter tone music at the Prague Conservatory, where he studied from 1935 to 1937.

While his works of the 1920s still clearly show the influence of Schönberg's atonal period, especially the Chamber Symphony Op. 9, the George Songs Op. 15 and Pierrot Lunaire, Op. 21, Ullmann's compositions from 1935 onwards, like the String Quartet No. 2 and Piano Sonata No. 1, are distinguished by a musical development that is more independent of Schönberg's inspiration. Similarly the opera Fall of the Antichrist develops the issues raised by Alban Berg's opera Wozzeck. Dissonant harmonics, highly charged musical expression, and masterly control of formal structure are characteristic of Ullmann's new and henceforth unmistakable personal style.

Theresienstadt concentration camp
On 8 September 1942 he was deported to the Theresienstadt concentration camp. Up to his deportation his list of works had reached 41 opus numbers and contained an additional three piano sonatas, song cycles on texts by various poets, operas, and the piano concerto Op. 25, which he finished in December 1939, nine months after the entry of German troops into Prague. Most of these works are missing. The manuscripts presumably disappeared during the occupation. Thirteen printed items, which Ullmann published privately and entrusted to a friend for safekeeping, have survived.

The particular nature of the camp at Theresienstadt enabled Ullmann to remain active musically: he was a piano accompanist, organized concerts ("Collegium musicum", "Studio for New Music"), wrote critiques of musical events, and composed, as part of a cultural circle including Karel Ančerl, Rafael Schachter, Gideon Klein, Hans Krása, and other prominent musicians imprisoned there. He wrote: "By no means did we sit weeping on the banks of the waters of Babylon. Our endeavor with respect to arts was commensurate with our will to live."

Overall, Ullmann "probably made the most significant contribution of any single individual to the musical life of Terezin", composing 20 works in the camp.

On 16 October 1944 he was deported to the camp at Auschwitz-Birkenau, where on 18 October 1944 he was killed in the gas chambers.

Later works
The work he completed in Theresienstadt was mostly preserved and comprises, in addition to choral works, song cycles and a quantity of stage music, such significant works as the last three piano sonatas, the Third String Quartet, the melodrama based on Rilke's Cornet poem, and the chamber opera The Emperor of Atlantis, or The Disobedience of Death, with a libretto by Peter Kien. Its premiere was planned for Theresienstadt in the autumn of 1944, conducted by Rafael Schachter, but it is believed that the SS commander noticed similarities between the Emperor of Atlantis and Adolf Hitler and suppressed it. However, eye-witness Herbert Thomas Mandl argues, "that the Emperor is not Hitler". The opera was first performed in Amsterdam in 1975 in a version of the conductor Kerry Woodward. It has been broadcast by BBC television in Britain, and there have been productions in several countries. Important productions took place in Bremen and Stuttgart in 1990; American premieres took place in San Francisco in 1975 and in Brooklyn in 1977. Other works include the song-cycle "Man and his Day" to poems by Ullmann's friend, the poet and later historian of Theresienstadt, H. G. Adler.

Since 1993 it is possible to perform the original version of the opera with the help of Karel Berman, based on his Terezin rolebook and the musicologist Ingo Schultz. This reconstructed original version of the original score has been used for the production of the opera done by the director Herbert Gantschacher for ARBOS - Company for Music and Theatre. This production used also Ullmann's original title "The Emperor of Atlantis or The Disobedience of Death" and has been recorded by the Prague label STUDIO MATOUS in 1994/1995. This production of the opera by Herbert Gantschacher has been performed for the first time at Terezin on 23 May 1995. From these first performances at Terezin ever a live recording exists done by ARBOS – Company for Music and Theatre. In all, Ullmann worked on the opera for 27 years, from the first impressions in the First World War in 1917 to the finalization at Terezin in 1944.

The most concrete formulation of this discourse occurs in the Emperor of Atlantis, with the parable of the Emperor's game with Death for Life. The "game", which concerns the Emperor's plan for the total destruction of all human life, ends with the ruin of the Emperor and with the vision of a new understanding between life and death.

When Ullmann was deported to Auschwitz, he left his works in the safekeeping of the philosopher Emil Utitz. After the war, Utitz gave them to H. G. Adler in Theresienstadt in 1945, and Adler brought the scores to England in 1947. Adler subsequently placed them on long-term loan with the Allgemeine Anthroposophische Gesellschaft in Dornach (AAG), Switzerland. In an apparent breach of contract the AAG subsequently deposited them with the Paul Sacher Stiftung, Basle, where they are currently being held illegally, prior to the preparation of a legally valid loan agreement.

Chronology 
 1898 Born in Teschen (in Austrian Silesia) on 1 January
 1909–16 Attended school in Vienna
 1916–18 Military service as a volunteer; service at the Front; promotion to Lieutenant
 1918 Attended the University of Vienna, studying law and attending lectures in sociology and philosophy of Wilhelm Jerusalem and attending Arnold Schönberg's "composition seminar"
 1920 autumn: Choirmaster and co-repetiteur under Alexander von Zemlinsky in the New German Theatre in Prague; later (1922–27) conductor
 1925 Composition of the "Schönberg Variations" for piano (first performance 1926 in Prague)
 1927–1928 Director of Opera in Aussig an der Elbe (Ústí nad Labem); afterwards back in Prague without a position
 1929 Success of the "Schönberg Variations" at the music festival of the International Society for New Music (Internationale Gesellschaft für Neue Musik; IGNM) in Geneva
 1929–1931 Composer and conductor for stage music in the theatre at Zurich
 1931–1933 Bookdealer in Stuttgart, as proprietor of the anthroposophical Novalis-Bücherstube
 1933 Flight from Stuttgart; return to Prague
 1934 Hertzka Prize for the orchestral arrangement of the "Schönberg Variations" (Op. 3b)
 1935–1937 Instruction in composition from Alois Hába
 1936 Hertzka Prize for the opera The Fall of the Antichrist (Op. 9)
 1938 After the performance of the Second String Quartet at the IGMN Festival in London, stays for about two months in Dornach near Basle
 1939 Beginning of the persecution of the Jews in the Protectorate of Bohemia and Moravia
 1942 (8 September) Deportation to Theresienstadt Concentration Camp; active as composer, conductor, pianist, organiser, teacher and music critic. Most important compositions preserved in manuscript: 3 piano sonatas; piano sonatas; songs; opera The Emperor of Atlantis; melodrama The Manner of Love and Death of Cornet Christoph Rilke
 1944 (16 October) Transfer to Auschwitz-Birkenau, where he was murdered in the gas chambers on 18 October 1944

List of the Prague and Theresienstadt works 
In the middle of 1942, shortly before his deportation to Theresienstadt concentration camp, Ullmann drew up a comprehensive list of his compositions to that point. This list was preserved in a London library as part of a letter to a correspondent whom it has not hitherto been possible to identify. In contrast to earlier lists of works, the London list is distinguished by an unbroken sequence of opus numbers (1–41) and the unmistakable incorporation of works or titles already known. Ullmann's list of works is of incalculable value in light of the lost or missing compositions, although it makes clear the full extent of the loss caused by persecution and war.

In the following summary Ullmann's opus numbering has been used, and extended for the opus numbers given to works composed in Theresienstadt. The order of titles is essentially chronological and takes account both of compositions known from earlier lists of works as well as of those bibliographically recorded. Uncertain dating is indicated by (?). Traces of an earlier numeration derive from the list of works from the 1920s (Riemann Musiklexikon 11/1929). These references occur only in connection with the "Schönberg Variations", which in relation to the opus numeration and to the chronology cut across the principle of arrangement used.

Prague works

Theresienstadt works

Sources 
 Schultz, Ingo, Viktor Ullmann. Leben und Werk Kassel, 2008. 
 Initiative Hans Krása in Hamburg: Komponisten in Theresienstadt, 
 Karas, Joza, Music in Terezin 1941–1945 NY: [Beaufort Books Publishers, undated
 Ludvova, Jitka, "Viktor Ullmann," in Hudebni veda 1979, No. 2, 99–122
 Schultz, Ingo: "Viktor Ullmann," in Flensburger Hefte, Sonderheft Nr. 8, Summer 1991, 5–25
 ARBOS – Company for Music and Theatre, Tracks to Viktor Ullmann, including material written by Herbert Thomas Mandl, who worked with Ullmann as a violinist in Terezín, Ingo Schultz, Jean-Jacques Van Vlasselaer, Dzevad Karahasan, and Herbert Gantschacher, edition selene, Vienna, 1998
 Herbert Thomas Mandl, Tracks to Terezín, interview with Herbert Thomas Mandl about Terezín and Viktor Ullmann, DVD, ARBOS Vienna-Salzburg-Klagenfurt, 2007
 Erich Heyduck and Herbert Gantschacher, Viktor Ullmann – Way to the Front 1917, DVD, ARBOS, VIENNA-Salzburg-Klagenfurt, 2007
 Herbert Gantschacher Viktor Ullmann – Zeuge und Opfer der Apokalypse / Witness and Victim of the Apocalypse / Testimone e vittima dell'Apocalisse / Svědek a oběť apokalypsy / Prič in žrtev apokalipse. ARBOS-Edition, Arnoldstein- Klagenfurt – Salzburg – Vienna – Prora – Prague 2015, 
 Герберт Ганчахер Виктор Ульман – Свидетель и жертва апокалипсиса «Культ-информ-пресс» Санкт-Петербург 2016, 
 The Emperor of Atlantis or The Disobedience of Death Anti-war opera by Viktor Ullmann (Music and libretto), original text of the libretto for the first time published in the German original including translations into English, Polish and Czech language with essays by Herbert Gantschacher and Dževad Karahasan, edited by Herbert Gantschacher, ARBOS-Edition, ISBN 978-3-9519833-1-8, Vienna-Salzburg-Klagenfurt 2022.

References

Recordings 
 "Schwer ist´s, das Schöne zu lassen" – complete songs for soprano and piano by Viktor Ullmann (Irena Troupová – soprano, Jan Dušek – piano). Prague: ArcoDiva, 2015.

External links 
 Documents about Viktor Ullmann in the collection of the Jewish Museum Prague
 
 Viktor Ullmann Foundation
 Ullmann biography and list of works
 Musica Reanimata (about composers persecuted by the Nazi regime)
 Jewish Music Institute
 Music of Theresienstadt
 Comprehensive discography of Terezin Composers by Claude Torres
 The OREL Foundation- Viktor Ullmann biography, as well as links to bibliography, works, discography and media
Further reading and listening on Terezín: The Music 1941-44
 Biography at World ORT's Music and the Holocaust

1898 births
1944 deaths
20th-century classical composers
20th-century conductors (music)
Austrian classical composers
Austrian male classical composers
Austrian opera composers
Czech classical composers
Czech conductors (music)
Jewish classical composers
Male opera composers
Second Viennese School
People from Český Těšín
Pupils of Arnold Schoenberg
Austrian Jews who died in the Holocaust
Austrian civilians killed in World War II
Austrian people who died in Auschwitz concentration camp
Czechoslovak civilians killed in World War II
People killed by gas chamber by Nazi Germany
Theresienstadt Ghetto prisoners
20th-century Czech male musicians
Austro-Hungarian military personnel of World War I